Liberation Square is located in central Baghdad at the intersection of al-Sadoun Street and the Jamhouriyya Bridge Road. Liberation Square is Baghdad's biggest and most central square located in the Al-Rusafa part of the city on the eastern banks of the River Tigris.

Description
Known as Tahrir Square locally, the square consists of open public spaces with the Ummah Garden, situated behind the square. It is home to a major monument which commemorates the 1958 establishment of the Republic of Iraq. The monument, known as Nasb al-Hurriyah celebrates Iraqi history by depicting key events leading up to the creation of a republic. The monument, designed by the leading Iraqi sculptor Jawad Saleem and architect, Rifat Chadirji, opened in 1961.

Events
Tahrir Square was reported as being the epicentre of the unrest of the October 2019 Iraqi protests.

References

External links
  

Geography of Baghdad
National squares
Monuments and memorials in Iraq
Squares in Iraq